Eelamurasu was a Tamil language newspaper, which was published between 1984 and 1987. It was known for promoting a Tamil nationalist prospective and a pro-LTTE stance. 

The first issues were produced in 1984, published by Myl Amirthalingam, a businessman from Jaffna, who ran as the United National Party candidate at 1977 Sri Lankan parliamentary elections in the Kayts electorate. In 1986 it was taken over by the LTTE, who then murdered its owner, Amirthalingam, and a senior reporter, I. Shanmugalingam, resulting in a number of the paper's senior journalists fleeing overseas. 

In 1987 it was closed down by the Indian Peace Keeping Force with all its copies confiscated, its journalists and workers arrested and its printing machinery destroyed.

References

1984 establishments in Sri Lanka
1987 disestablishments in Sri Lanka
Defunct daily newspapers published in Sri Lanka
Defunct Tamil-language newspapers published in Sri Lanka
Mass media in Jaffna
Publications established in 1984
Publications disestablished in 1987
Tamil-language newspapers published in Sri Lanka
Indian Peace Keeping Force